Mohamed Issa Shahin (born 17 April 1963) is a Jordanian sports shooter. He competed in the mixed trap event at the 1980 Summer Olympics.

References

1963 births
Living people
Jordanian male sport shooters
Olympic shooters of Jordan
Shooters at the 1980 Summer Olympics
Place of birth missing (living people)
20th-century Jordanian people